The Panama women's national volleyball team is the national team of Panama.

The far over weighted  team played in the 2011 NORCECA Championship under the guidance of Reynaldo Ortega. The team ended-up in the 9th place.

Results

NORCECA Championship
1969 — 7th place
1971 to 1983 — Did not participate
2003 to 2009 — Did not participate
2011 — 9th place

References

External links
NORCECA

National women's volleyball teams
Volleyball
Women's sport in Panama
Volleyball in Panama